The Snob is a lost 1921 American silent comedy film directed by Sam Wood, written by Alice Eyton, and starring Wanda Hawley, Edwin Stevens, Walter Hiers, Sylvia Ashton, W. E. Lawrence, and Julia Faye. It was released in January 1921, by Realart Pictures Corporation.

Cast         
Wanda Hawley as Kathryn Haynes
Edwin Stevens as Jim Haynes
Walter Hiers as Pud Welland
Sylvia Ashton as Mrs. Haynes
W. E. Lawrence as Capt. William Putnam 
Julia Faye as Betty Welland
Richard Wayne as 'Pep' Kennedy
Josephine Crowell		
Althea Worthley

References

External links

1921 films
1920s English-language films
Silent American comedy films
1921 comedy films
Films directed by Sam Wood
Lost American films
American silent feature films
American black-and-white films
1921 lost films
Lost comedy films
1920s American films